The New Sonia Wayward is a 1960 thriller novel by the British writer Michael Innes. It was published in the United States by Dodd, Mead under the alternative title  The Case of Sonia Wayward. It is an inverted detective story with comedy elements, with the focus on the murderous protagonist. It was one of several standalone novels by Innes, who was best known for his series featuring the Golden Age detective John Appleby. Maurice Richardson writing in The Observer felt it "rather light for a suspense story but most pleasingly written."

Synopsis
A retired colonel is married to a bullying tyrant who also happens to be a bestselling novelist. While on a sailing trip with his wife in the English Channel he throws her overboard. However, well-practiced in her style of writing, he continues to produce her novels to considerable success.

References

Bibliography
 Hubin, Allen J. Crime Fiction, 1749-1980: A Comprehensive Bibliography. Garland Publishing, 1984.
 Reilly, John M. Twentieth Century Crime & Mystery Writers. Springer, 2015.
 Scheper, George L. Michael Innes. Ungar, 1986.

1960 British novels
British mystery novels
British crime novels
British thriller novels
Novels by Michael Innes
Novels set in England
British detective novels
Victor Gollancz Ltd books